Roger Joseph Boscovich, born Ruđer Bošković, was an 18th-century scientist.

Boscovich may also refer to:
 Boscovich (crater) on the Moon
 Bošković (surname), a South Slavic surname

Ruđer Bošković may also refer to:
 Ruđer Bošković Institute
 Astronomical Society Ruđer Bošković